Reji Joseph Pulluthuruthiyil (born 12 December 1968 ) is an Indian journalist and writer. Reji Pulluthuruthiyil has won many national and international awards, including Statesman Award, Kerala State Journalism Award (3 times).

Personal life 
Reji Joseph is married to Ashly; they have two children Agnus Reji Pulluthuruthiyil and Alphons Reji Pulluthuruthiyil  . He and his family lives in Pazhayidom, Kanjirappally in Kottayam district.

Books
Janikkum mumpe (2003)
Nava Sahasrabdhathinte visvasanayakan (2005)

Awards
Ramnath Goenka Excellence in Journalism Awards 2006 -2007
Kerala state media award 2020 
 Madhava Warrier Puraskaram (2022)

References 

Living people
Indian journalists
1968 births